Ram Kishore Dogne is an Indian politician and a member of the Indian National Congress party.

Political career
He became an MLA in 2013. 

Recently, he had reached the MP Vidhan Sabha half-naked, protesting against the water crisis caused by the government in his constituency Harda, because of not releasing water from the dam.

Political views
He supports Congress Party's ideology.

Personal life
He is married to Rajni Dogne. They have two children.

References

See also
Madhya Pradesh Legislative Assembly
2013 Madhya Pradesh Legislative Assembly election
2008 Madhya Pradesh Legislative Assembly election

1965 births
Living people
Indian National Congress politicians from Madhya Pradesh